SS William E. Corey is a steel-hulled propeller-driven Great Lakes freighter that had a lengthy career on the Great Lakes. She served from her launching in 1905 to her conversion to a breakwater in 1970.

History
William E. Corey was a product of the Chicago Shipbuilding Company of Chicago, Illinois. William E. Corey was launched on March 24, 1905, as hull number #67. The laker was one of four almost identical vessels;  and  William E. Corey were both launched in Chicago,  launched in West Bay City, Michigan and  launched in Superior, Wisconsin. All four vessels were the largest on the lakes at the time of their launch, hence the unofficial title "Queen of the Lakes".

Mataafa Storm

Shortly after her launch the brand new William E. Corey encountered one of the worst storms in Great Lakes history, the Mataafa Storm of 1905. On November 28, William E. Corey was driven hard aground onto Gull Island Reef in the Apostle Islands. After the storm William E. Corey was removed and repaired.

SS Ridgetown

Over the next fifty three years William E. Corey changed hands many times until in 1963 she was sold to the Upper Lakes Shipping Company and renamed Ridgetown. The ship served for seven more years until in 1970 when she was scuttled as a temporary breakwater at Nanticoke, Ontario in the summer. Later refloated at an unknown date. In the summer of 1974 she was scuttled as a breakwater at Mississauga, Ontario.

References

External links

1905 ships
Maritime incidents in 1905
Ships built in Chicago
Ships sunk as breakwaters
Merchant ships of the United States
Queen of the Lakes
Ships powered by a triple expansion steam engine
Shipwrecks of the Ontario coast